Smithfield is a village in Fulton County, Illinois, United States. The population was 230 at the 2010 census. The village is named in honor of Dr. Joseph N. Smith.

Geography
Smithfield is located in western Fulton County at  (40.473086, -90.292639). Illinois Route 95 forms the northern edge of the village; the highway leads east  to Cuba and west  to Marietta.

Smithfield is served by the Keokuk Junction Railway, a subsidiary of Pioneer Railcorp. BNSF once used the tracks through Smithfield.

History
Smithfield was founded in 1868.

Much of Smithfield was destroyed by fire in 1900.

Smithfield was once serviced by TP&W (Toledo, Peoria And Western Railway) before sold to KJRY (Keokuk Junction Railway).

Smithfield once had a grocery story, Bank, Hardware Store and Railroad Depot. The Bank is now the Historic Museum as well as the Red Brick School.

The Village once contained a Jail. The old jail cells can be seen in the Red Brick School parking lot.

Demographics

As of the census of 2000, there were 214 people, 95 households, and 66 families residing in the village. The racial makeup of the village was 99.53% White, and 0.47% from two or more races.

There were 95 households, out of which 24.2% had children under the age of 18 living with them, 60.0% were married couples living together, 5.3% had a female householder with no husband present, and 30.5% were non-families. 29.5% of all households were made up of individuals, and 16.8% had someone living alone who was 65 years of age or older.  The average household size was 2.25 and the average family size was 2.74.

In the village, the population was spread out, with 19.6% under the age of 18, 5.6% from 18 to 24, 29.9% from 25 to 44, 29.9% from 45 to 64, and 15.0% who were 65 years of age or older.  The median age was 42 years. For every 100 females, there were 96.3 males.  For every 100 females age 18 and over, there were 87.0 males.

The median income for a household in the village was $32,031, and the median income for a family was $43,125. Males had a median income of $37,857 versus $25,938 for females. The per capita income for the village was $16,661.  About 3.3% of families and 3.8% of the population were below the poverty line, including none of those under the age of eighteen and 5.3% of those 65 or over.

References

Villages in Illinois
Villages in Fulton County, Illinois